Rupa Gurunath is the former president of the Tamil Nadu Cricket Association (TNCA). She was the first woman to hold the office. She is also a 'whole time' director of India Cements Limited.

Corporate career 
Gurunath is on the board of eight different companies including India Cements Limited the owners of the Chennai Super Kings Indian Premier League franchise through Chennai Super Kings Cricket Ltd (CSKCL) holding company.

In 2019, at the 87th Annual General Meeting, Gurunath was elected unopposed as president of the Tamil Nadu Cricket Association (TNCA), making her the first woman to head a state cricket association in India. She succeeded her father N. Srinivasan as president. The Tamil Nadu cricket team enjoying considerable success during her tenure, winning back-to-back Syed Mushtaq Ali T20 Trophies in 2021 and 2021. In June 2021, Gurunath was found guilty of 'conflict of interest' by the BCCI ethics officer, retired Justice D. K. Jain due to her also serving as a "whole-time director and promoter of ICL [India Cements Limited]", the owners of the Chennai Super Kings IPL franchise. Gurunath resigned as the president of the TNCA in December 2021, citing an intention to "focus on business and personal commitments."

Personal life 
Guranath is the daughter of Indian industrialist, former president of the BCCI, and former chairman of the ICC, N. Srinivasan.

Rupa is married to Gurunath Meiyappan, a former Chennai Super Kings official and member of the AVM family, who was banned for life from any involvement in cricket for his role in the 2013 IPL betting scandal by the Lodha Committee.

References 

Living people
Indian business executives
1974 births
Indian cricket administrators
India Cements